We Meet at Tove's is a 1946 Danish drama directed by Alice O'Fredericks and Grete Frische. The film stars an ensemble cast, including Illona Wieselmann, Gull-Maj Norin, Helle Virkner and Inger Stender in a story about eight women who meet ten years after their high school graduation to discuss the reality of their lives. It has been noted as one of the first Danish films which focused on women and women's rights.

Cast

References

External links
 Så mødes vi hos Tove at IMDb
Så mødes vi hos Tove, at Den Danske Film Database (In Danish)
Så mødes vi hos Tove Det Danske Filminstitut (In Danish)

1940s Danish-language films
1946 films
Films directed by Alice O'Fredericks
Films directed by Grete Frische
Films scored by Sven Gyldmark
1946 drama films
Danish drama films
Danish black-and-white films